Summer Holiday is a 1963 British CinemaScope and Technicolor musical film starring singer Cliff Richard. The film was directed by Peter Yates (his directorial debut), produced by Kenneth Harper. The original screenplay was written by Peter Myers and Ronald Cass (who also wrote most of the song numbers and lyrics). 
 
The cast stars Lauri Peters, David Kossoff, Ron Moody and The Shadows and features Melvyn Hayes, Teddy Green, Jeremy Bulloch, Una Stubbs, Pamela Hart, Jacqueline Daryl, Madge Ryan, Lionel Murton, Christine Lawson, Wendy Barry and Nicholas Phipps.  
 
Herbert Ross choreographed the musical numbers.

Plot 
Don and friends Cyril, Steve and Edwin are bus mechanics at the huge London Transport bus overhaul works in Aldenham, Hertfordshire. During a miserably wet British summer lunch break, Don arrives, having persuaded London Transport to lend him and his friends an AEC Regent III RT double-decker bus. They convert the bus into a holiday caravan, which they drive across continental Europe, intending to reach the South of France. On the way, they are joined by a trio of young women Sandy, Angie and Mimsie, who are a singing group Do-Re-Mi, and change their destination to Athens in Greece, which means passing through Yugoslavia.  They are also joined by a runaway singer Barbara pretending to be a boy, herself being pursued by her mother Stella and agent Jerry.

Cast
Cliff Richard as Don
Lauri Peters as Barbara
David Kossoff as Magistrate
Ron Moody as Orlando
The Shadows as themselves 
Melvyn Hayes as Cyril
Teddy Green - Steve
Jeremy Bulloch Edwin
Una Stubbs as Sandy 
Pamela Hart as Angie
Jacqueline Daryl as Mimsie
Madge Ryan as Stella
Lionel Murton as Jerry
Christine Lawson as Annie
Wendy Barry as Shepherdess 
Nicholas Phipps as Wrightmore

Production

The original director was Sidney Furie but he was held up on The Boys. He was replaced by John Krish. Eventually Peter Yates directed the film.

In April 1962, Associated British Picture Corporation of Elstree bought three used RT double-decker buses (RT2305 (KGU334), RT2366 (KGU395), and RT4326 (NLE990)) from London Transport. They were all converted to look like RT1881 (with a fake registration number, WLB991) so they could be used for filming different segments.

The opening ten minutes was filmed at the Aldenham Works, Elstree, where Cliff's character and friends are mechanics at the main bus servicing depot for London Transport. While on lunch one rainy day, they come up with the idea of converting an old RT bus into a mobile home. They enlist the help of their workmates in a musical segment that uses the track Seven Days to a Holiday. The scenes were shot at the works in 1962, during its annual summer shutdown. Filming included large parts of the works as well as numerous actual employees as extras.

The rest of the film was shot in Greece.

Soundtrack

There are 16 song and musical numbers in the film: "Seven Days to a Holiday", "Let Us Take You for a Ride", "Stranger in Town", "Swinging Affair", "Really Waltzing", "Yugoslavian Wedding", "All At Once", "Summer Holiday", "Bachelor Boy", "Dancing Shoes", "Foot Tapper", "Big News", "The Next Time", "Les Girls", "Round and Round", and "Orlando's Mime".

The film's producers felt that female lead in the film, Lauri Peters, was not a strong enough singer after several test recording sessions, and all of her parts, both in the film and on the soundtrack album, were dubbed by session vocalist Grazina Frame. Frame had overdubbed female singing voices in Cliff Richard's earlier film The Young Ones.

Cliff Richard, Melvyn Hayes, and the Shadows were recalled to Elstree some weeks after completion of shooting to record Bachelor Boy, as the distributors felt the film was too short.

Release 
The film had its world premiere at the Warner Theatre in London's West End on 10 January 1963. A crowd of 3,000 people turned up to Leicester Square and Cliff Richard was unable to exit his car due to the crowds, so did not attend the opening.

Box-office
The film was a box-office hit, repeating the success of Cliff Richard's previous film The Young Ones (1961).
 Summer Holiday was the second most popular movie at the British box office in 1963, after the James Bond feature From Russia with Love, with comedy film Tom Jones coming third.

The film's release helped Cliff Richard to be voted by exhibitors as the most popular star at the British box-office in the same year. The film was not a commercial success in the United States.

Cultural impact
The majority of the numbers integrated dance with song – not merely serving as scenes to promote a number of "hit-parade" songs. Ross, an American choreographer later became a film director in his own right.

Many singles from Cliff Richard lifted from the film, including the title track "Summer Holiday", as well as "The Next Time", "Bachelor Boy" and The Shadows instrumental "Foot Tapper" all reached Number one in the British charts during the first three months of 1963.

The film suggested to the photographer Daniel Meadows a way in which he might emulate Benjamin Stone and travel around and photograph Britain from 1973 to 1974.

Stage adaptations 
Summer Holiday was adapted into a stage musical in the mid-1990s, starring Darren Day in the role that Cliff Richard played. It premiered for a summer season at The Opera House in Blackpool in 1996, and then later toured nationally, before returning to Blackpool in 1998. The cast for these included Claire Buckfield, Isla Fisher, Faith Brown, Ross King, Peter Baldwin, and René Zagger. It was also recorded and released on video, entitled "Summer Holiday - The Hits", which was all the musical numbers strung together by clips of Darren Day writing postcards to his friends, and describing what was happening in the story as he wrote.

The stage musical differs in a number of respects from the film version. For example, the route to Athens is via Italy in the stage version rather than the original film route via Yugoslavia. The songs also differ, and include a number of songs from Cliff Richard's other early back catalogue, such as "The Young Ones".

It was revived in 2003, starring Stefan Booth, but later starred Darren Day again. This production also included Day's future partner Suzanne Shaw (from the pop group Hear'say) as Bobby, and Aimi MacDonald as Bobby's mother. The production toured the UK. A further production in 2018 toured the UK with Ray Quinn in the Cliff Richard role and Bobby Crush as "Jerry", the agent.

A revival of the stage musical toured East Anglia in Summer 2022, featuring a professional cast of actor-musicians augmented by local dancers. The production toured the Suffolk and Norfolk coasts, starting in Southwold before heading to Sheringham and finishing in Great Yarmouth.

References

External links 
 
 
Summer Holiday at TCMDB

1963 films
1963 musical films
British musical films
Buses in fiction
Films shot at Associated British Studios
Films directed by Peter Yates
Films shot in Greece
Films shot in Athens
British road movies
CinemaScope films
Associated British Picture Corporation
1963 directorial debut films
1960s English-language films
1960s British films